Shri Devi may refer to:
 Sridevi, Indian actress
 Lakshmi, a Hindu deity
 Palden Lhamo, a Buddhist deity
 Shridevi, the Telugu dubbed version of 1989 Bollywood film Chandni
 Sridevi, an unreleased Telugu film
 Sreedevi (film), an Indian Malayalam film
 Shri devi, a species of theropod dinosaur